Cormac MacDermot was a 13th-century Irish ruler who was King of Moylurg, reigning 1218–44.

A great-great-great grandson of Cormac, Dermot Ruadh MacDermot, was ancestor of the MacDermot Roe sept of the family.

References
 "Mac Dermot of Moylurg: The Story of a Connacht Family", Dermot Mac Dermot, 1996.
 http://www.macdermot.com/

Connachta
Year of birth missing
Year of death missing
13th-century Irish monarchs
Kings of Connacht
MacDermot family